Malye Alabukhi 2-ye is a rural locality (a selo) in Maloabukhskoye Rural Settlement, Gribanovsky District, Voronezh Oblast, Russia. The population was 257 as of 2010. There are 7 streets.

Geography 
Malye Alabukhi 2-ye is located 24 km northeast of Gribanovsky (the district's administrative centre) by road. Malye Alabukhi 1-ye is the nearest rural locality.

References 

Rural localities in Gribanovsky District